玉树 may refer to several places in Qinghai Province, China:

Yushu Tibetan Autonomous Prefecture (玉树藏族自治州/玉樹藏族自治州/ཡུལ་ཤུལ་་བོད་རིགས་རང་སྐྱོང་ཁུལ།), prefecture
Yushu County (玉树县/玉樹縣/ཡུས་ཧྲུའུ་), county in Yushu Prefecture